Junior football may refer to:

 Association football played at the junior level, such as under the auspices of the Scottish Junior Football Association
 Association football played in the Scottish Junior Football League (1892-1947)
 Canadian football played at the junior level in Canada, such as in the Canadian Junior Football League
 Gaelic football played at junior national level, such as the All-Ireland Junior Football Championship
 Gaelic football played at junior local level, such as the East Kerry Junior Football Championship

See also
 Senior football (disambiguation)